Dennis Kassian (born July 14, 1941) is a Canadian former professional ice hockey player.

During the 1972–73 season, Kassian played 50 games in the World Hockey Association with the Alberta Oilers, recording six goals and seven assists to go along with 14 penalty minutes.

Kassian also had a long career playing in various minor professional leagues across North America. He played four seasons in the American Hockey League with the Buffalo Bisons.

References

External links

1941 births
Living people
Buffalo Bisons (AHL) players
Canadian expatriate ice hockey players in the United States
Canadian ice hockey left wingers
Cincinnati Wings players
Edmonton Flyers (WHL) players
Edmonton Oilers (WHA) players
Ice hockey people from Alberta
Memphis Wings players
People from Vegreville
Salt Lake Golden Eagles (WHL) players
Winston-Salem Polar Twins (SHL) players